Dileesh or Dilesh is an Indic masculine given name. Notable people with this name include:
Dilesh Gunaratne, Sri Lankan cricketer
Dileesh Nair (born 1981), Indian film director and script writer
Dileesh Pothan, Indian film director and actor 
Dileesh Thiruvangalath, Indian Sales executive

Indian masculine given names
Sinhalese masculine given names